Peter Rasmussen (born 15 October 1975) is a Danish football referee from Copenhagen. He began his international career during the Euro 2007 U19s Championship and has since officiated in the UEFA Europa League and the Euro 2008 qualifiers. He has yet to be selected as a primary referee in the finals for a senior international competition. On 11 August 2010, he was selected to officiate the friendly match between the Republic of Ireland and Argentina in Dublin. He officiated the friendly match between England and Belgium, in which the hawk-eye technology was tested for the first time ever in an international match, although he did not use it to make decisions in the match.

External links
Peter Rasmussen profile at Worldreferee.com

1975 births
Living people
Danish football referees
Sportspeople from Copenhagen